Murray Kennett (born June 28, 1952 in Kamloops, British Columbia) is a former World Hockey Association player. He played for the Indianapolis Racers and Edmonton Oilers.

External links
 

1952 births
Living people
Brandon Wheat Kings players
Canadian ice hockey defencemen
Edmonton Oilers (WHA) players
Sportspeople from Kamloops
Indianapolis Racers players
Ice hockey people from British Columbia
Victoria Cougars (WHL) players
20th-century Canadian people